Curculigo orchioides (commonly called golden eye-grass, xian mao, weevil-wort, कालो मुस्ली (in Nepal) black musli, Kali musli, or Kali Musali) is an endangered flowering plant species in the genus Curculigo. It is native to Nepal, China, Japan, the Indian subcontinent, Papuasia, and Micronesia.

Names
C. orchidoides is known as Nilappana (നിലപ്പന) meaning ground palm in Malayalam, କୁଆକେନ୍ଦା in
Odiya, ତାଳମୂଳୀ in Bengali-Tallur, and நிலப்பனை in Tamil.

Chemical compounds
From C. orchidoides, several chemical compounds of the curculigoside class including curculigoside A, B, C and D and curculigine A and D have been isolated.

References

External links 
 
 

orchioides
Plants described in 1788
Flora of Asia
Flora of Papuasia
Flora of the Northwestern Pacific